The top goalscorers each season of club football competitions in Iran are listed below.

Top division nationwide league

The list below contains the top goalscorer(s) for the top league in Iranian football, in every year that a nationwide league was played.

Notes
* The 1978/1979 season was cancelled due to the Iranian Revolution.

Tehran Provincial League

 
The list below contains the top goalscorer(s) for the Tehran Province League, first tier of Iran football in 1980s.

By Club
The list below shows clubs with most top-scorer in Iranian football league.

See also
List of Iran Pro League all-time top goal scorers

References
Data on Iran's top goalscorers – RSSSF, by Milad Niqui and Asghar Zarei, Retrieved 2 November 2007
Special Edition: Thirty years of History of Persepolis Soccer Club: From Shahin til Pirouzi, Kayhan Publishing.

Goalscorers, Season
Iran
Association football player non-biographical articles